Pieter-Jan Hannes (born 30 October 1992, in Mortsel) is a Belgian athlete specialising in the middle-distance events, primarily the 1500 metres, as well as cross-country running. He represented his country at the 2013 World Championships without qualifying for the semifinals. He also won a gold medal at the 2013 European U23 Championships.

Competition record

Personal bests
Outdoor
800 metres – 1:47.30 (Oordegem-Lede 2013)
1500 metres – 3:34.49 (Heusden-Zolder 2014)
Mile – 3:51.84 NR (Oslo 2015)
3000 metres – 7:54.06 (Herentals 2013)
Indoor
1500 metres – 3:37.30 (Birmingham 2015)
3000 metres – 7:47.55 (Prague 2015)

References

Belgian male middle-distance runners
1992 births
Living people
People from Mortsel
World Athletics Championships athletes for Belgium
Athletes (track and field) at the 2016 Summer Olympics
Olympic athletes of Belgium
Sportspeople from Antwerp Province
21st-century Belgian people